Psychedelica Blues is a Norwegian youth drama film from 1969 directed by Nils Reinhardt Christensen. Along with Øyvind Vennerød's Himmel og helvete, it was the first Norwegian film that dealt with adolescents' use of narcotics, and it was the first Norwegian film to clearly depict the use of LSD. Because it was released after Vennerød's film, it received far less attention.

Plot
The story deals with four days in Lissy's life in which she finds an outlet for a rebellious urge that has built up over several years. Lissy comes from a sheltered home with a conventional father who is a municipal politician. In the new environment she slips into the circle around the jazz group The Blue Bells, where she meets Lillegutt (Little Boy). He is a key member of the gang and supplier of drugs. Lillegutt is a cynical and intelligent judge of character, who has turned his back on a society of hypocrites. Through him, Lissy opens her eyes to the dividing lines between what is accepted and what is real.

Background
Christensen had previously seen success with the film Line in 1961 and with his Stompa films (1962–1967). He chose to base his last film on Karin Bang's 1968 novel Blues. In contrast to Himmel og helvete, Christensen chose a more experimentalist style and a less moralizing story, always portraying Lissy's own perspective.

Reception
The film received mixed reviews. Finn Syversen wrote in Aftenposten that "Christensen has wisely refrained from using the notion of drug abuse as a polemic topic. The debate on this phenomenon, which is relatively little explored by medical and sociological experts, has thus not been allowed to influence his intentions in any provocative, trend-setting way. ... We fully believe in Kjersti Døvigen's Lissy, who gives the role a character that reveals that she has a certain intuition for symptoms of loneliness in the cynical pessimism that plagues so many of today's young people. ... Repetitions of motifs were probably not avoidable in such a film, but they do not weaken the impression to any great extent. Psychedelia Blues is a highly worthwhile experiment."

Cast

 Kjersti Døvigen as Lissy
 Finn Kvalem as Lillegutt
 Ståle Bjørnhaug as Leif
 Ditlef Eckhoff as Wilhelm
 Thomas Fasting as Jan
 Truls Dramar as Joppe
 Knut M. Hansson as Ragnar Borg
 Vibeke Falk as Molle Borg
 Kjell Frantzen as Brun, a university lecturer
 Svein Sturla Hungnes 
 Helge Hurum as a band member
 Per Jansen as Eigil
 Randi Nordby as Mrs. Korsmo
 Eva Opaker as an alternative
 Arve Opsahl as Hans Korsmo
 Anne Marie Ottersen as Liven
 Gloria Rose as La Bommie
 Espen Rud as a band member
 Kåre Tengs-Pedersen as a band member

References

External links 
 
 Psychedelica Blues at the National Library of Norway

1969 films
Norwegian drama films
1960s Norwegian-language films
Films directed by Nils Reinhardt Christensen